Antonio Ricci (died 1488) was a Roman Catholic prelate who served as Archbishop of Reggio Calabria (1453–1488).

Biography
On 4 June 1453, Antonio Ricci was appointed during the papacy of Pope Nicholas V as Archbishop of Reggio Calabria.
He served as Archbishop of Reggio Calabria until his death in 1488.

References

External links and additional sources
 (for Chronology of Bishops) 
 (for Chronology of Bishops) 

15th-century Roman Catholic archbishops in the Kingdom of Naples
Bishops appointed by Pope Nicholas V
1488 deaths